David R. Smith is an American  physicist and professor of electrical and computer engineering at Duke University in North Carolina. Smith's research focuses on electromagnetic metamaterials, or materials with a negative index of refraction.

Smith obtained his B.Sc. and Ph.D. in physics from the University of California, San Diego (UCSD) in 1988 and 1994. In 2000, as a postdoctoral fellow working in the laboratory of Professor Sheldon Schultz at UCSD, Smith and his colleagues discovered the first material that exhibited a negative index of refraction.

For his research in mematerials, Smith, along with four European researchers, was awarded the Descartes Prize in 2005, the European Union's top prize for collaborative research. He is known also as the first person to create a functioning cloak of invisibility that renders an object invisible in microwave wavelengths. Although the cloaking device had limited ability to conceal an object from light of a single microwave wavelength, the experiment was an initial demonstration of the potential of metamaterials, constructed composite materials with unusual optical properties, to behave in unique ways because of both their structural properties.

In 2009 Reuters news service listed Smith as a potential Nobel laureate in physics.

References

21st-century American physicists
Living people
University of California, San Diego alumni
Duke University faculty
Metamaterials scientists
Year of birth missing (living people)
American electrical engineers